Sulochana Latkar (born 30 July 1928) known by her screen name Sulochana, is a well-known actress of Marathi and Hindi cinema and has acted in 50 films in Marathi and around 250 films in Hindi. She is most known for her performances in Marathi films such as Sasurvas (1946), Vahinichya Bangdya (1953), Meeth Bhakar, Sangtye Aika (1959) and Dhakti Jau in the lead roles, as well as for the mother roles she played in Hindi cinema right from 1959 film Dil Dekhe Dekho to the year 1995. She and Nirupa Roy epitomized the "mother" roles right from 1959 until the early 1990s.

Career
Sulochana Latkar made her debut in films in 1946. She was lead actress in Marathi films from 1946 to 1961 with films like Sasurvas (1946), Vahinichya Bangdya (1953), Meeth Bhakar, Sangtye Aika(1959), Laxmi Ali Ghara, Moti Manse, Jivacha Sakha, Pativrata, Sukhache Sobti, Bhaubheej, Akashganga and Dhakti Jau. She was often paired opposite Nazir Hussain, Trilok Kapoor and Ashok Kumar throughout her career in Hindi films. She quoted in an interview that she loved playing mother to three actors - Sunil Dutt, Dev Anand and Rajesh Khanna. She often played mother or as close relative in Hindi films with Sunil Dutt as the leading man such as in Heera, Jhoola, Ek Phool Char Kante, Sujatha, Mehrbaan (1967), Chirag, Bhai Bahen (1969), Reshma Aur Shera, Umar Qaid, Muqabla, Jaani Dushman and Badle Ki Aag. She was a regular in films with Dev Anand in the lead roles, where either Dev Anand was her son or relative and some of their films together were Jab Pyar Kisise Hota Hai, Pyar Mohabbat, Duniya (1968), Jhonny Mera Naam, Amir Garib, Warrant and Joshila. Since 1969, she often played an on-screen close relative to the character played by Rajesh Khanna and some of their famous films included Dil Daulat Duniya, Bahraon Ke Sapne, Doli, Kati Patang, Mere Jeevan Saathi, Prem Nagar, Aakraman, Bhola Bhala, Tyaag, Aashiq Hoon Baharaon Ka and Adhikar (1986). Her other best known films include Nai Roshni (1967), Aaye Din Bahar Ke, Aaye Milan Ki Bela, Ab Dilli Dur Nahin, Majboor, Gora Aur Kala, Devar, Bandini, Kahani Kismat Ki, Talaash (1969) and Azaad (1978).

In 2003, she was awarded the Chitrabhushan Award instituted by the Akhil Bharatiya Marathi Chitrapat Mahamandal, on the occasion of the birth anniversary of Baburao Painter, one of the founders of the modern Marathi cinema.

Awards
Latkar is a recipient of the civilian honour of Padma Shri (1999). 
She was awarded the Filmfare Lifetime Achievement Award in 2004. In 2009, she was awarded the Maharashtra Bhushan Award by the Government of Maharashtra.

Personal life
She now stays at Prabhadevi, Mumbai.
She was married at 14. Her daughter's name is Kanchan Ghanekar who was the wife of Marathi stage superstar Dr. Kashinath Ghanekar.

Selected filmography

See also
Kashinath Ghanekar (Son-in-law Married to Sulochana's daughter Kanchan)

References

External links
 
 Recent images of Sulochana Devi

1928 births
Living people
Actresses from Mumbai
Indian film actresses
Actresses in Hindi cinema
Actresses in Marathi cinema
Marathi people
Recipients of the Maharashtra Bhushan Award
Recipients of the Padma Shri in arts
Filmfare Lifetime Achievement Award winners